Dybul is a Polish surname. Notable people with the surname include:

 Bogna Dybul (born 1990), Polish handball player
 Mark R. Dybul (born 1963), American diplomat and physician

See also
 

Polish-language surnames